Negrar di Valpolicella is a comune (municipality) in the Province of Verona in the Italian region Veneto, about  west of Venice and about  northwest of Verona. Since 8 February 2019, the official name has been changed to "Negrar di Valpolicella" (L.R. n. 7, 8 February 2019) after a referendum was held in the town.

History
In prehistoric times, it was a center of the Arusnati, a not-well-known population of perhaps mixed origins. In the Middle Ages it was a free commune until it was acquired by the Scaliger of Verona (14th century). Later it was part of the Republic of Venice, under which, in 1791, it received the right to hold a livestock market. In 2020 the municipality announced that a Roman villa had been discovered beneath a local vineyard.

Archaeology 

In May 2020, the discovery of a well-preserved Roman mosaic floor dating to the 3rd century AD buried underneath a vineyard is reported after about a century of searching the site of a long-lost villa.

Economy
Negrar and its villages are mainly devoted to agricultural, with production of cherries, vine and fruit, and of wines such as Valpolicella, Amarone and Recioto.

Notable people
 Andrea Benvenuti, athlete
 Pietro Boselli, engineer, former mathematician and model 
 Davide Formolo, cyclist
 Matteo Manassero, professional golfer
 Damiano Tommasi, ex professional footballer, major of Verona
 Ronnie Quintarelli, racing driver.

Gallery

References

External links
 Official website

Cities and towns in Veneto